Can You Fly is the second album by singer-songwriter Freedy Johnston. It was released in 1992 on Bar/None Records. Can You Fly appeared on Fast Folks year-end list of the ten best albums of 1992, and The Village Voices Robert Christgau later dubbed it "a perfect album".

In order to finance the recording of the album, Johnston sold some farmland that he inherited from his grandfather. This decision is mentioned in the opening lines of the first track, "Trying to Tell You I Don't Know".

The song "California Thing" appeared on the soundtrack of the film Heavy, starring Liv Tyler and Deborah Harry.

"The Lucky One" was covered by Mary Lou Lord on her 1998 album Got No Shadow.

Track listing
All songs written by Freedy Johnston.
"Trying to Tell You I Don't Know" – 4:24
"In the New Sunshine" – 2:45
"Tearing Down This Place" – 4:10
"Remember Me" – 2:54
"Wheels" – 3:18
"The Lucky One" – 3:09
"Can You Fly" – 4:34
"Responsible" – 5:28
"The Mortician's Daughter" – 3:56
"Sincere" – 4:18
"Down in Love" – 3:04
"California Thing" – 3:03
"We Will Shine" – 4:39

Personnel
Freedy Johnston – vocals, guitar, bass
Graham Maby – bass, electric guitar, background vocals
Brian Doherty – drums, percussion
Alan Bezozi – drums, tambourine, wind chimes, percussion, keyboard
Knut Bohn – guitar, organ, percussion, background vocals
Kevin Salem – guitar, background vocals
Jared Michael Nickerson – bass
Bob Rupe – guitar
Jimmy Lee – guitar
Marshall Crenshaw – guitar, bass
Chris Stamey – electric guitar
Dave Schramm – lap steel
James MacMillan – bass
Jane Scarpantoni – cello
Kenny Margolis – accordion
Syd Straw - vocals

References

1992 albums
Freedy Johnston albums